The 2013 Gamba Osaka season saw Gamba Osaka compete in J. League Division 2 following their shock relegation the previous year.   As such they did not compete in the 2013 J. League Cup, but did participate in the 2013 Emperor's Cup in addition to their 2013 J. League Division 2 fixtures.   

Maintaining the bulk of the previous season's squad including Japanese internationals, captain Endō and defenders Akira Kaji and Yasuyuki Konno, Gamba were able to make their stay in J. League 2 a short one and were crowned champions in November 2013 following a season long title race with neighbours Vissel Kobe who had also been relegated along with Gamba the previous year.   

Takashi Usami returned to the club in mid-season following a loan-spell in Germany and his goals as well as those from Brazilians Leandro and Adi Rocha saw Gamba finish the season with 87 points and 99 goals to their credit.

J.League 2 Results

Final standings

Match Day Line-Ups

The following players appeared for Gamba Osaka during 2013 J. League 2:

  = Substitute on,  = Substitute Off,  = Number of goals scored,  = Yellow Card and  = Red Card.

Emperor's Cup Results

Match Day Line-Ups

  = Substitute on,  = Substitute Off,  = Number of goals scored,  = Yellow Card and  = Red Card.

Squad statistics

Statistics accurate as of end of 2013 season.

References

Gamba Osaka
Gamba Osaka seasons